Milochov is a village in the Považská Bystrica District, Trenčín Region of northwestern Slovakia

Parts of the Považská Bystrica city